{{Taxobox
|name = Dolichoderus affinis
|image = 
|regnum = Animalia
|phylum = Arthropoda
|classis = Insecta
|ordo = Hymenoptera
|familia = Formicidae
|subfamilia = Dolichoderinae
|genus = Dolichoderus
|species = D. affinis
|binomial = Dolichoderus affinis
|binomial_authority = Emery, 1889
|subdivision_ranks = Subspecies
|subdivision =
Dolichoderus affinis glabripes Forel, 1895
Dolichoderus affinis mus Santschi, 1920
|synonyms =
'Dolichoderus affinis nigricans Emery, 1895
}}Dolichoderus affinis is a species of ant in the genus Dolichoderus''. Described by Emery in 1889, the species is endemic to various countries of Asia.

References

Dolichoderus
Hymenoptera of Asia
Insects described in 1889